Dactylorhiza aristata, the keyflower, is a species of orchid. It is native to Japan, Korea, northeastern China (Hebei, Henan, Shandong, Shanxi), the Russian Far East, and Alaska (including the Aleutians).

References

aristata
Orchids of Asia
Flora of Alaska
Orchids of the United States
Plants described in 1835
Flora without expected TNC conservation status